Kowalewice (formerly ) is a village in the administrative district of Gmina Darłowo, within Sławno County, West Pomeranian Voivodeship, in north-western Poland. The village has one known church. 

For the history of the region, see History of Pomerania.

The village has a population of 184.

References

Kowalewice